Phylliroe is a genus of average sized (up to ), highly transparent pelagic nudibranchs, marine gastropod molluscs in the order Opisthobranchia, that consists of two known species. It is notable for being an open-ocean hunter that resembles a fish in body plan and locomotion, an example of convergent evolution.

Distribution and habitat
 P. atlantica occurs in the (sub) tropical waters of the Atlantic and Pacific oceans.
 P. bucephalum is known from the Mediterranean.

Ecology 
Juveniles of P. bucephalum are found exclusively feeding on the bell of the hydromedusa Zanclea costata (this junior synonym was given precedence over Mnestra parasites). At first the nudibranch is attached to the inside of the bell of the meduse with its very small foot. It sucks tissue from the ring, radial canals and manubrium of the meduse and grows from 1.6 mm to 11 mm in just ten days, while the meduse shrinks. When the slug is as big as the meduse, it starts to swim, eating the remaining parts, including the tentacles.

In adulthood its diet is no longer restricted to Zanclea, although observations of feeding behaviour are sparse. Phylliroe uses its rhinophores (long horns) to prey on jellies, and the nearly vestigial remnant of its foot to adhere to the jelly prey. Phylliroe has been seen approaching a swarm of the larvacean Oikopleura albicans from below, grabbing a specimen with its paired denticulate jaws and swallowing it in half a minute. Adults have also been observed to prey on the meduse Aequoria. 

Branches of the digestive tract may contain symbiontic zooxanthellae, but this relationship has not yet been studied. It is unclear if all specimens of P. bucephalum harbor these symbionts. It is possible they are obtained from their prey.

P. bucephalum sometimes suffers from parasitic trematodes, both attached to its skin and inside its body.

References

External links 
 film showing internal organs, and animal swimming

Further reading 
 
 Powell A. W. B., New Zealand Mollusca, William Collins Publishers Ltd, Auckland, New Zealand 1979 

Phylliroidae